Fairview is an unincorporated community in Marshall County, West Virginia, United States. It was also known as Ella and Nauvoo.

A colony of early Mormons settled here.

References 

Unincorporated communities in West Virginia
Unincorporated communities in Marshall County, West Virginia